Steve Haguy (born 24 April 1981) is a Guadeloupean professional footballer who plays as a midfielder for Championnat National 2 side AS Vitré. His career spanned 21 seasons, including professional contracts at Ligue 2 clubs Laval and Nîmes.

Club career
Born in Paris, Haguy was noticed by the staff of Ligue 2 side Lorient whilst playing for Championnat de France Amateur side Levallois. He subsequently signed an amateur contract with the club in the summer of 2002, hoping to make a breakthrough into the professional ranks. He made his Ligue 2 debut as a substitute in the 1–1 draw at AS Saint-Étienne on 4 September 2002. During his time at the club he also made a substitute appearance in the 2002–03 UEFA Cup, against Denizlispor in the first round, second leg.

After leaving Lorient at the end of the 2002–03 season, Haguy played the next five seasons for Championnat National clubs Romorantin, Cherbourg and Vannes. With Vannes he won the league and promotion to Ligue 2, but he was unexpectedly released by the club in the summer of 2008. He subsequently signed for Laval on a one-year deal, with the option of a professional deal if the club won promotion back to Ligue 2. Laval won promotion at the end of the 2008–09 season, and Haguy made his professional debut in the first game of the 2009–10 Ligue 2 season on 7 August 2009, against Brest. He scored his first professional goal in the 1–0 away win at SC Bastia on 28 August 2009.

Released at the end of his Laval contract, Haguy signed for Nîmes Olympique, after a trial, on 9 July 2010. He stayed two-and-a-half seasons with the club, suffering relegation from Ligue 2 and then winning the Championnat National the following season.

In January 2013 he signed for Le Poiré-sur-Vie in the Championnat National. At the end of the season, after a trial at Auxerre, he signed for a second time for Cherbourg, this time in Championnat de France Amateur. A season there was followed by a season with Jura Sud in 2014–15 at the same level, before Haguy returned the Championnat National with Belfort.

After a season-and-a-half with Belfort, Haguy left for CS Sedan Ardennes, who offered him a six month contract with an option for a further year if the team remained in the Championnat National. Sedan were relegated and Haguy was released. In August 2017 he signed for Épinal in Championnat National 2.

International career
Haguy made his international debut for Guadeloupe on 1 June 2016, in a qualifying game for the 2017 Caribbean Cup against Martinique.

Honours
Nimes
 Championnat National: 2007–08 (Vannes), 2011–12

References

External links

1981 births
Living people
French people of Guadeloupean descent
Footballers from Paris
French footballers
Guadeloupean footballers
Association football midfielders
Levallois SC players
FC Lorient players
SO Romorantin players
AS Cherbourg Football players
Vannes OC players
Stade Lavallois players
Nîmes Olympique players
Vendée Poiré-sur-Vie Football players
Jura Sud Foot players
ASM Belfort players
SAS Épinal players
SC Bastia players
AS Vitré players
Ligue 2 players
Championnat National players
Championnat National 2 players
Championnat National 3 players
Guadeloupe international footballers